The following are the national records in athletics in Uruguay maintained by its national athletics federation: Confederación Atlética del Uruguay (CAU).

Outdoor

Key to tables:

h = hand timing

NWI = no wind information

OT = oversized track (> 200m in circumference)

Men

Women

Indoor

Men

Women

Notes

References
General
Uruguayan Outdoor Records 29 November 2021 updated
Uruguayan Indoor Records 15 July 2017 updated
Specific

External links
CAU web site

Uruguay
records
Athletics
Athletics